Sergey Igorevich Dmitriyev (19 March 1964 – 26 December 2022) was a Russian football coach and a player.

International career
Dmitriyev earned six caps for the USSR national football team, and was on the squad for UEFA Euro 1988, but did not play in any games at the tournament. He scored his only goal for USSR on 2 February 1985 in a friendly against Morocco.

Personal life and death
Dmitriyev's second wife was Svetlana Laukhova. He was part of Zenit Saint Petersburg.

Dmitriyev died on 26 December 2022, at the age of 58.

Honours
 Soviet Top League: 1984, 1991
 Soviet Cup: 1991
 Russian Top League: 1997
 Russian Cup: 1998

References

External links
Profile (in Russian)

1964 births
2022 deaths
Footballers from Saint Petersburg
Russian footballers
Soviet footballers
Association football forwards
Soviet Union international footballers
UEFA Euro 1988 players
Soviet Top League players
Segunda División players
FC Dynamo Saint Petersburg players
FC Zenit Saint Petersburg players
Russian Premier League players
FC Dynamo Moscow players
PFC CSKA Moscow players
Xerez CD footballers
FC Linz players
FC St. Gallen players
Hapoel Ashkelon F.C. players
FC Tyumen players
FC Spartak Moscow players
FC Kristall Smolensk players
Russian football managers
FC Dynamo Saint Petersburg managers
Brunei national football team managers
Soviet expatriate footballers
Russian expatriate footballers
Soviet expatriate sportspeople in Spain
Expatriate footballers in Spain
Russian expatriate sportspeople in Austria
Expatriate footballers in Austria
Russian expatriate sportspeople in Switzerland
Expatriate footballers in Switzerland
Russian expatriate sportspeople in Israel
Expatriate footballers in Israel
Russian expatriate sportspeople in Germany
Expatriate footballers in Germany